Jacob LeRoy "LeRoy" Koppendrayer (born May 22, 1941) is an American politician who served in the Minnesota House of Representatives from 1991 to 1997.

Career
Koppendrayer was appointed to the Minnesota Public Utilities Commission by Governor Arne Carlson in December 1997 and re-appointed by Governor Tim Pawlenty in 2004. His term on the commission ended in 2010.

Before his time in the Minnesota House of Representatives, he worked as a dairy farmer, an agriculture consultant, and a truck driver.

References

External links

 Commissioner Koppendrayer's Web Page

1941 births
Living people
Republican Party members of the Minnesota House of Representatives
People from Princeton, Minnesota